Swim Or Sink is a 1932 Fleischer Studios animated short film directed by Dave Fleischer and starring Betty Boop, Koko the Clown, and Bimbo. It was reissued under the titles S.O.S.

Synopsis
As a ship sails in stormy water, it begins to sink and passengers try to leave using whatever method they can. Betty, Bimbo and Koko end up on a raft. After Betty sings a song, they see a ship and think they are going to be saved but it turns out to be a pirate ship. They are captured and the captain eyes up Betty as she tries to cover her legs by pulling down her dress. Koko and Bimbo are put in irons whilst Betty remains on deck. When all the pirates are eventually eaten by a large fish, Betty, Bimbo and Koko remain on board laughing as the cartoon ends.

References

External links

1932 films
Betty Boop cartoons
1930s American animated films
American black-and-white films
1932 animated films
Paramount Pictures short films
Fleischer Studios short films
Short films directed by Dave Fleischer
Pirate films